Zhang Bo (Chinese: 张波; born 27 June 1985) is a Chinese football player who currently plays for China League One side Nanjing City F.C.

Club career
Zhang Bo started his professional footballer career with the Jiangsu Sainty youth team before being promoted to their senior squad in the 2006 China League One season. He would go on to part of the team that won the 2008 China League One division and promotion into the top tier of Chinese football. He would eventually make his Chinese Super League debut for Jiangsu on 24 October 2009 in a game against Shandong Luneng Taishan. He would also be loaned out to another top tier club in Chongqing Lifan during the season.

In January 2012, Zhang transferred to second tier side Chengdu Tiancheng. Initially Zhang Bo established himself as regular within the team, however by the 2014 China League One season the club experienced relegation and were dissolved due to wage arrears.

In March 2015, Zhang transferred to China League Two side Tianjin Locomotive.
In February 2019, Zhang transferred to League Two newcomer Nanjing Shaye.

Career statistics 
Statistics accurate as of match played 31 December 2020.

Honours

Club
Jiangsu Sainty
China League One: 2008

References

External links

1985 births
Living people
Chinese footballers
Sportspeople from Xuzhou
Footballers from Jiangsu
Jiangsu F.C. players
Chengdu Tiancheng F.C. players
Chinese Super League players
China League One players
Association football midfielders
21st-century Chinese people